Azygophleps liturata is a moth in the  family Cossidae. It is found in Namibia, Botswana and South Africa.

References

Moths described in 1879
Azygophleps
Insects of Namibia
Moths of Africa